The Central (Exchange Square) Bus Terminus is a major bus terminus located in Central, Central and Western District, Hong Kong. Situated on the ground floor of the Exchange Square commercial complex, the terminus is regarded as the central hub of bus routes in the Central District.

With a total of 14 berths for franchised buses, Central (Exchange Square) is now the largest bus station in Hong Kong which still functions as a bus terminus, in terms of the number of boarding platforms.

Location and structure
Central (Exchange Square) Bus Terminus is situated on the ground floor of the Exchange Square complex, which consists of 3 office blocks. The bus terminus is located beneath Two Exchange Square and Three Exchange Square.

The terminus consists of 14 boarding/alighting platforms for franchised bus routes. In addition to the franchised bus terminus, a smaller station with a public light bus terminus, a public loading/unloading area as well as a taxi stand is located under One Exchange Square. 

For the franchised bus terminus, buses enter via the three entrances located at Harbour View Street, and leave the terminus through the two exits at Connaught Road Central; for the minibus and taxi stand, both the entrance and the exit are located on Harbour View Street.

Routes serving the terminus 
As of August 2012, 18 franchised bus routes terminate at Exchange Square, most of them being local routes serving the Southern District (including the area around Aberdeen Harbour as well as Stanley) as well as cross-harbour routes to points in the New Territories.

Feeder transport 
MTR  and  Hong Kong station

See also
 Exchange Square (Hong Kong)

References
 Public Transport Atlas 6th edition, published by Universal Publications
 The Development of Hong Kong Island Bus Routes in the 20th Century by Stanley Yung, published by BSI Hobbies

External links
Terminus Information on Citybus/NWFB Website 

Central, Hong Kong